Lene Lund Høy Karlsen (born 8 June 1979) is a Danish former handball player who lastly played in Viborg HK.

She was born in Gudbjerg in Denmark and began playing handball in GOG with whom she won bronze medals in 2003. In her first season in Viborg HK she won both the Danish championship as well as the EHF Champions League.

In the 2007/08 season Karlsen got a competitor for the line place when the German line player Anja Althaus came to Viborg HK from her former club, German Trier.

On the Danish national team she has played 50 national games (per 2007).

She was married June 20, 2009 with Henrik Høy Karlsen in Gudbjerg Kirker. Her contract ran out in the summer of 2010, but she stopped before that because of pregnancy.

References 

 About Karlsen on Viborg HK's homepage 

Danish female handball players
1979 births
Living people
People from Svendborg Municipality
Sportspeople from the Region of Southern Denmark